The Ziyar minaret is a historical minaret in the Isfahan province in Iran. The minaret is located 33 km to the east of Isfahan city near the village Ziyar on the southern side of Zayanderud . It is 51 m high and is the second highest historical minaret in the province Isfahan after the Sarban minaret and the only three-storey minaret in the province, the height of which has not decreased in the course of time. No construction dates have been mentioned in its kufic inscriptions, but because of its similarity to the minarets of Seljukid era, it is estimated that it was built in the 12th century. The crown of the minaret has turquoise tiles.

The spiral staircase of the minaret still exists and can be mounted. From the third floor, the Barsian mosque and minaret can be seen.

See also 
List of the historical structures in the Isfahan province

References 

12th-century architecture
Minarets in Iran